This is a list of members of both houses of the Federal Assembly from the Canton of Obwalden. As one of the cantons defined until 1999 as "half-cantons", Obwalden elects only one member to the Council of States

Members of the Council of States

Members of the National Council

References

Lists of Members of the Swiss Federal Assembly by canton